The 2016 Malaysia Cup group stage featured 16 teams. The teams were drawn into fourth groups of four, and played each other home-and-away in a round-robin format. The top two teams in each group advanced to the 2016 Malaysia Cup quarter finals.

Groups
The matchdays started on 12 July 2016.

Group A

Group B

Group C

Group D

References

2016 in Malaysian football
Malaysia Cup seasons